The Baltimore class was a class of three sloops of wooden construction built for the Royal Navy during 1742-43. Two were ordered in 1742 and a third in 1743, and constituted a further increase in size from the 200 burthen tons which had been the normal size from 1728 to 1739; Baltimore was built to a design by Charles Calvert, 5th Baron Baltimore, one of the members of the Admiralty Board at that time; it is uncertain whether the other two ships were built to the same design, or to the same overall dimensions but to a design prepared by Jacob Allin, the Surveyor of the Navy. 

Although initially armed with ten 4-pounder guns, this class was built with nine pairs of gunports on the upper deck (each port flanked by two pairs of row-ports), and the sloops in 1744 had their ordnance increased to fourteen guns. Baltimore, the only one of the three to survive beyond 1748, was converted into a bomb vessel in 1758.

Vessels

References 

McLaughlan, Ian. The Sloop of War 1650-1763. Seaforth Publishing, 2014. .
Winfield, Rif. British Warships in the Age of Sail 1714-1792: Design, Construction, Careers and Fates. Seaforth Publishing, 2007. .

Sloop classes